Top Model is a fashion-themed reality television show format.

Top Model may also refer to:

Versions of the reality television show
 Top Model (French TV series)
 Top Model (Polish TV series)
 Top Model (Scandinavian TV series)

Other uses
 Top Model (Brazilian TV series), a Brazilian telenovela
 La Mouette Top Model, a French hang glider design

See also
 Model (person), a person who models clothing, jewelry, etc.
 Supermodel, a highly paid fashion model